Fort Ridgely Creek is a stream in Nicollet County, in the U.S. state of Minnesota. It is a tributary of the Minnesota River.

Fort Ridgely Creek flows past Fort Ridgely, from which the creek took its name.

See also
List of rivers of Minnesota

References

Rivers of Nicollet County, Minnesota
Rivers of Renville County, Minnesota
Rivers of Minnesota
Southern Minnesota trout streams